Themistoclea (Themistokleia; also Aristoclea (Ἀριστοκλεία Aristokleia), Theoclea (Θεοκλεία Theokleia); fl. 6th century BCE) was, according to surviving sources, Pythagoras’ teacher while a priestess at Delphi. She is also considered one of the first European philosophers, though none of her works  seem to have survived since the 6th century.

Life

In the biography of Pythagoras in his Lives and Opinions of Eminent Philosophers, Diogenes Laërtius (3rd century CE) cites the statement of Aristoxenus (4th century BCE) that Themistoclea taught Pythagoras his moral doctrines:
Aristoxenus says that Pythagoras got most of his moral doctrines from the Delphic priestess Themistoclea.

Porphyry (233–305 CE) calls her Aristoclea (Aristokleia), although there is little doubt that he is referring to the same person. Porphyry repeats the claim that she was the teacher of Pythagoras:
He (Pythagoras) taught much else, which he claimed to have learned from Aristoclea at Delphi.

The 10th-century Suda encyclopedia calls her Theoclea (Theokleia) and states that she was the sister of Pythagoras, but this information probably arises from a corruption and misunderstanding of the passage in Diogenes Laertius.Themistoclea was a 6th century seer or Pythia of Apollo at the temple at Delphi. In Greek, themis refers to divine order or natural law. She is reputed to have been the teacher of Pythagoras, the great mathematician of Samos who believed that the workings of the material world could be expressed in terms of numbers.Themistoclea represents an ancient epistemological approach which wedded experience, reason and the supernatural. As the Prophetess of Apollo at Delphi she would have been a source of much ancient wisdom, including knowledge of the natural world, astronomy, medicine, music, mathematics, animal husbandry and philosophy. She would have offered advice pertaining to sowing and harvests, whether to go to war, and who and when to marry.In Diogenes Laeterius’ work, The Lives and Opinions of Eminent Philosophers, in the section concerning the "Life Of Pythagoras," Diogenes states that "Aristoxenus asserts that Pythagoras derived the greater part of his ethical doctrines from Themistoclea, the priestess at Delphi.

The Oracle of Delphi .... practiced from approx. 1400 BC until 362 AD 
The priestesses of Delphi were some of mentor and tutors to many of Greeks ancient philosophers.The priestress of the mystical Oracle of Delphi, also known as the Pythia, was a very powerful figure in ancient Greece. She was the giver of prophecies from the great god Apollo, to whom the city of Delphi was sacred. There were many Oracles around Greece, but the oracle of Delphi was the most famous, as it was said she was chosen by Apollo himself. As legend has it, the Oracle could not give straight answers; only talk in mutters or in strange riddles. Modern scientists have learned that ethylene gas may have come from the earth, putting the Pythia into a trance and then she would tell the future. The Greeks would come from all around for a consultation with the Oracle of Delphi. No important decision could be made without her.

References

6th-century BC births
6th-century BC deaths
6th-century BC clergy
6th-century BC Greek people
6th-century BC Greek women
Delphi
Pythagoreans
Ancient Greek women philosophers
Ancient Greek priestesses
Presocratic philosophers
6th-century BC philosophers